During the 1996–97 English football season, Rotherham United F.C. competed in the Football League Second Division.

Season summary
In the 1996–97 season, Danny Bergara in the summer became Rotherham's next manager, but was given little time to turn the club’s fortunes. Rotherham endured a poor season and were relegated, and Bergara lost his job at the club.

Final league table

Results
Rotherham United's score comes first

Legend

Football League Second Division

FA Cup

League Cup

Football League Trophy

Squad

Notes

References

Rotherham United F.C. seasons
Rotherham United